Tapu Te Ranga Marae is located in Island Bay, Wellington, New Zealand. The marae was founded by Bruce Stewart who lived there until his death in 2017. It was a tribute to Stewart's mother, Hinetai Hirini, and is listed as a heritage site .

History 
Tapu Te Ranga Marae was built by Bruce Stewart who "got out of jail with $25 and a dream" in 1974. Upon release, he found that many young Māori had come to Wellington with the promise of jobs. However, many were unable to find work. He began picking them up in his van and taking them to workshops in the suburb of Newtown where they could learn to make furniture from recycled timbers. Later, he began taking them to a community art space called The Workshop to learn the art of carving.

In December 1974, a pākeha man by the name of Joseph "Taffy" Williamson was murdered on Hopper Street in the Wellington suburb of Te Aro after he provoked 18 year old Rufus Marsh by yelling racial slurs. This led to media outrage and prompted then Mayor of Wellington, Michael Fowler, to visit Stewart. Fowler asked what could be done, and Stewart replied "we want to live Māori, that’s what the problem is, we want to live Māori.”

Stewart leased 24 hectares of land from the Home of Compassion and construction of the marae began, continuing for 30 years. This was led by Bruce Stewart with help from his whānau, tradesmen, local youth, and gang members.

The main building was built into a hillside, which was levelled by hand into seven sections using only pick and shovels. Its frame was constructed in segments using wooden cases used to transport vehicles from Japan. It also featured recycled timbers such as doors and stained-glass windows salvaged from demolition contracts.

The building was ten stories high and has been described as a "hand-crafted labyrinth of stairways and mystical rooms, of art and sculpture, a dream-land place." It was named Pare Waaka.

Fire 
At 12.30am on Sunday 9 June 2019 the main building of the marae complex caught fire and was completely destroyed. There were a number of people staying in the building at the time, including a group of 27 children from the Ngaio Scouts and 9 adults. All escaped unharmed. The fire was attended by over 50 firefighters. It is thought that the fire started by a spark from a brazier getting into a storeroom.

References

External links
 Official Marae website

Buildings and structures in Wellington City
Marae in New Zealand
1970s architecture in New Zealand